George A. Lovejoy may refer to:
 George A. Lovejoy (New Hampshire politician) (1931–2015)
 George A. Lovejoy (Washington politician) (1879–1944)

See also 
 George Lovejoy (1923–2003), Australian radio sports commentator